Benedict is a masculine given name of Latin origin, meaning "blessed". Etymologically, it is derived from the Latin words bene ('good') and dicte ('speak'), i.e. "well spoken". The name was borne by Saint Benedict of Nursia (480–547), often called the founder of Western Christian monasticism.

Forms of Benedict in different languages

List of people with the given name Benedict, Benedikt, Bénédict, or Bennedict

Saints
Benedict of Nursia (480–547), Italian monk, founder of the Benedictine order of monasticism
Benedict of Aniane (747–821), Benedictine monk and monastic reformer
Benedict Biscop (628–690), Anglo-Saxon abbot
Benedict (bishop of Milan) (died 732), archbishop of Milan
Benedict of Szkalka (died 1012), Hungarian Benedictine monk
  Benedict the Bridge-Builder (ca. 1163–1184), also known as Bénézet
Benedict the Moor (1526–1589), also known as Benedict the Black
Benedict Joseph Labre (1748–1783), French Franciscan mendicant
Benedict Menni (1841–1914), Italian priest

Popes and antipopes
Pope Benedict I ( died 579), pope from 575 to 579
Pope Benedict II (635–685), pope in 684/685,  also a saint
Pope Benedict III (died 858), pope from 855 to 858
Pope Benedict IV (died 903), pope from 900 to 903
Pope Benedict V (died 965), pope in 964, in opposition to Pope Leo VIII
Pope Benedict VI (died 974), pope in 973/974
Pope Benedict VII (died 983), pope from 974 to 983
Pope Benedict VIII (died 1024), pope from 1012 to 1024
Pope Benedict IX (c. 1010–1056), pope on three occasions between 1032 and 1048
Antipope Benedict X (c. 1000–c. 1070)
Pope Benedict XI (1240–1304), pope from 1303 to 1304
Pope Benedict XII (c. 1280–1342), pope from 1334 to 1342
Antipope Benedict XIII (1328–1423)
Antipope Benedict XIV, the name used by two closely related minor antipopes of the 15th century
Pope Benedict XIII (1649–1730), pope from 1724 to 1730
Pope Benedict XIV (1675–1758), pope from 1740 to 1758
Pope Benedict XV (1854–1922), pope from 1914 to 1922
Pope Benedict XVI (1927–2022), pope from 2005 to 2013

Other
Benedict (archbishop of Edessa) (flourished c.1098–1104), first archbishop of Edessa of the Latin rite
Benedict (canon of St. Peter's) (12th century), religious and liturgical writer of Rome
Benedict of Bari (fl. 1227), monk and religious author
Benedict of Poland (1200–1280), Polish Franciscan friar, traveler, explorer, and interpreter
Benedict, Duke of Finland (1254–1291), Swedish prelate bishop and duke
Benedikt Kotruljević (1416–1469), Ragusan Renaissance humanist
Benedikt Rejt (1450–1533), Bohemian architect
Benedikt Kuripečič (1491–1531), Slovene diplomat
Benedikt Dreyer (1495–1555), German sculptor, carver and painter
Benedict Goëz (1562–1697), Portuguese Jesuit missionary and explorer (Bento de Góis)
Benedict de Spinoza (1632–1677), Dutch philosopher of Portuguese Sephardi descent
Benedikt Anton Aufschnaiter (1665–1742), Austrian Baroque composer
Benedict Arnold (1741–1801), American general who after 1779 shifted his allegiance to the British
Benedikt Schack (1758–1826), Bohemian composer and tenor
Benedict Fogelberg (1786–1854), Swedish sculptor
Benedict Arnold (congressman) (1789–1849), American politician representing New York State
Benedikt Waldeck (1802–1870), Progressive Prussian politician
Benedict Morel (1809–1873), French psychiatrist
Benedict Stilling (1810–1879), German anatomist and surgeon 
Benedikt Roezl (1824–1885), Austrian botanist
Benedict Balansa (1825–1891), French botanist
Benedikt Niese (1849–1910), German classical scholar
Benedict Friedlaender (1866–1908), German zoologist and sexologist
Bénédict Pierre Georges Hochreutiner (1873–1959), Swiss botanist and plant taxonomist
Benedict Chifley (1885–1951), Australian Prime Minister
Benedikt Livshits (1887–1938), Russian poet, writer and translator
Benedict I of Jerusalem (1892–1980), Greek Orthodox Patriarch of Jerusalem
Benedict Wallet Vilakazi (1906–1947), South African Zulu poet, novelist, and educator
Benedict Gregorios (1916–1994), Metropolitan Archbishop of the Malankara Church
Benedict Kiely (1919–2007), Irish writer and broadcaster
Benedikt Sigurðsson Gröndal (1924–2010), Prime Minister of Iceland
Benedict Anderson (1936–2015), Irish political scientist and historian of South East Asia
Benedict Erofeev (1938–1990), Russian writer and Soviet dissident
Benedict Daswa (1946–1990), South African school principal and mob murder victim
Benedict Gross (born 1950), American mathematician
Benedict F. Kiernan (born 1953), American historian
Benedikt Jóhannesson (born 1955), Icelandic publisher, businessman and politician
Benedict Campbell (born 1957), Canadian actor
Benedict Iroha (born 1969), Nigerian footballer
Benedict Jackson (born 1967),  English golfer
Benedict Wong (born 1971), English actor 
Benedict Akwuegbu (born 1974), Nigerian footballer
Benedict Cumberbatch (born 1976),  English actor
Benedict McCarthy (born 1977), South African footballer
Benedict Wells (born 1984), German-Swiss novelist
Benedikt Höwedes (born 1988), German footballer
Benedikt Doll (born 1990), German biathlete
Bennedict Mathurin (born 2002), Canadian basketball player

Fictional characters
Benedick, a character from Shakespeare's Much Ado About Nothing
Benedict of Amber, from the Chronicles of Amber
Bénédict, the title character in Berlioz's opera Béatrice et Bénédict

References

English masculine given names
German masculine given names